The 1st constituency of Aude is a French legislative constituency in the Aude département.

Deputies

Election results

2022

 
 
 
 
 
 
 
|-
| colspan="8" bgcolor="#E9E9E9"|
|-

2017

2012

|- style="background:#e9e9e9; text-align:center;"
! colspan="2" rowspan="2" style="text-align:left;" | Candidate
! rowspan="2" colspan="2" style="text-align:left;" | Party
! colspan="2" | 1st round
! colspan="2" | 2nd round
|- style="background:#e9e9e9; text-align:center;"
! style="width:75px;"| Votes
! style="width:30px;"| %
! style="width:75px;"| Votes
! style="width:30px;"| %
|-
| style="background-color:" |
| style="text-align:left;" | Jean-Claude Perez
| style="text-align:left;" | Socialist Party
| PS
| 
| 41.37%
| 
| 60.97%
|-
| style="background-color:" |
| style="text-align:left;" | Robert Morio
| style="text-align:left;" | National Front
| FN
| 
| 20.67%
| 
| 39.03%
|-
| style="background-color:" |
| style="text-align:left;" | Monique Boonen
| style="text-align:left;" | Union for a Popular Movement
| UMP
| 
| 17.64%
| colspan="2" style="text-align:left;" |
|-
| style="background-color:" |
| style="text-align:left;" | Rosine Charlut
| style="text-align:left;" | Left Front
| FG
| 
| 7.88%
| colspan="2" style="text-align:left;" |
|-
| style="background-color:" |
| style="text-align:left;" | Gérard Schivardi
| style="text-align:left;" | Far Left
| EXG
| 
| 4.88%
| colspan="2" style="text-align:left;" |
|-
| style="background-color:" |
| style="text-align:left;" | Christine Sthémer
| style="text-align:left;" | The Greens
| VEC
| 
| 3.17%
| colspan="2" style="text-align:left;" |
|-
| style="background-color:" |
| style="text-align:left;" | Isabelle Fillon
| style="text-align:left;" | 
| CEN
| 
| 1.44%
| colspan="2" style="text-align:left;" |
|-
| style="background-color:" |
| style="text-align:left;" | André Zuliani
| style="text-align:left;" | Miscellaneous Right
| DVD
| 
| 1.03%
| colspan="2" style="text-align:left;" |
|-
| style="background-color:" |
| style="text-align:left;" | Jean-François Daraud
| style="text-align:left;" | New Centre-Presidential Majority
| NCE
| 
| 1.03%
| colspan="2" style="text-align:left;" |
|-
| style="background-color:" |
| style="text-align:left;" | Lucile el Hedri
| style="text-align:left;" | Far Left
| EXG
| 
| 0.36%
| colspan="2" style="text-align:left;" |
|-
| style="background-color:" |
| style="text-align:left;" | Jean-Marc Jouffroy
| style="text-align:left;" | Ecologist
| ECO
| 
| 0.28%
| colspan="2" style="text-align:left;" |
|-
| style="background-color:" |
| style="text-align:left;" | Laurent Aslan
| style="text-align:left;" | Regionalist
| REG
| 
| 0.23%
| colspan="2" style="text-align:left;" |
|-
| style="background-color:" |
| style="text-align:left;" | Marie Dugied-Soriano
| style="text-align:left;" | Other
| AUT
| 
| 0.00%
| colspan="2" style="text-align:left;" |
|-
| colspan="8" style="background:#e9e9e9;"|
|- style="font-weight:bold"
| colspan="4" style="text-align:left;" | Total
| 
| 100%
| 
| 100%
|-
| colspan="8" style="background:#e9e9e9;"|
|-
| colspan="4" style="text-align:left;" | Registered voters
| 
| style="background:#e9e9e9;"|
| 
| style="background:#e9e9e9;"|
|-
| colspan="4" style="text-align:left;" | Blank/Void ballots
| 
| 2.16%
| 
| 6.94%
|-
| colspan="4" style="text-align:left;" | Turnout
| 
| 62.22%
| 
| 61.79%
|-
| colspan="4" style="text-align:left;" | Abstentions
| 
| 37.78%
| 
| 38.21%
|-
| colspan="8" style="background:#e9e9e9;"|
|- style="font-weight:bold"
| colspan="6" style="text-align:left;" | Result
| colspan="2" style="background-color:" | PS HOLD
|}

2007

|- style="background:#e9e9e9; text-align:center;"
! colspan="2" rowspan="2" style="text-align:left;" | Candidate
! rowspan="2" colspan="2" style="text-align:left;" | Party
! colspan="2" | 1st round
! colspan="2" | 2nd round
|- style="background:#e9e9e9; text-align:center;"
! style="width:75px;"| Votes
! style="width:30px;"| %
! style="width:75px;"| Votes
! style="width:30px;"| %
|-
| style="background-color:" |
| style="text-align:left;" | Jean-Claude Perez
| style="text-align:left;" | Socialist Party
| PS
| 
| 37.85%
| 
| 54.47%
|-
| style="background-color:" |
| style="text-align:left;" | Isabelle Chesa
| style="text-align:left;" | Union for a Popular Movement
| UMP
| 
| 37.38%
| 
| 45.53%
|-
| style="background-color:" |
| style="text-align:left;" | Monique Denux
| style="text-align:left;" | Democratic Movement
| MoDem
| 
| 5.97%
| colspan="2" style="text-align:left;" |
|-
| style="background-color:" |
| style="text-align:left;" | Robert Morio
| style="text-align:left;" | National Front
| FN
| 
| 5.26%
| colspan="2" style="text-align:left;" |
|-
| style="background-color:" |
| style="text-align:left;" | Amandine Carrazoni Omari
| style="text-align:left;" | Communist
| COM
| 
| 4.24%
| colspan="2" style="text-align:left;" |
|-
| style="background-color:" |
| style="text-align:left;" | Alain Vielmas
| style="text-align:left;" | Far Left
| EXG
| 
| 2.45%
| colspan="2" style="text-align:left;" |
|-
| style="background-color:" |
| style="text-align:left;" | Claude-Marie Benson
| style="text-align:left;" | The Greens
| VEC
| 
| 2.33%
| colspan="2" style="text-align:left;" |
|-
| style="background-color:" |
| style="text-align:left;" | Claudine Latorre
| style="text-align:left;" | Hunting, Fishing, Nature, Traditions
| CPNT
| 
| 1.15%
| colspan="2" style="text-align:left;" |
|-
| style="background-color:" |
| style="text-align:left;" | Claudine Gamerre
| style="text-align:left;" | Ecologist
| ECO
| 
| 0.70%
| colspan="2" style="text-align:left;" |
|-
| style="background-color:" |
| style="text-align:left;" | Jean-Pierre Brun
| style="text-align:left;" | Far Right
| EXD
| 
| 0.63%
| colspan="2" style="text-align:left;" |
|-
| style="background-color:" |
| style="text-align:left;" | Denis Bord
| style="text-align:left;" | Divers
| DIV
| 
| 0.58%
| colspan="2" style="text-align:left;" |
|-
| style="background-color:" |
| style="text-align:left;" | Magali Urroz
| style="text-align:left;" | Regionalist
| REG
| 
| 0.54%
| colspan="2" style="text-align:left;" |
|-
| style="background-color:" |
| style="text-align:left;" | Lucile el Hedri
| style="text-align:left;" | Far Left
| EXG
| 
| 0.50%
| colspan="2" style="text-align:left;" |
|-
| style="background-color:" |
| style="text-align:left;" | Jacques Vieules
| style="text-align:left;" | Far Left
| EXG
| 
| 0.41%
| colspan="2" style="text-align:left;" |
|-
| colspan="8" style="background:#e9e9e9;"|
|- style="font-weight:bold"
| colspan="4" style="text-align:left;" | Total
| 
| 100%
| 
| 100%
|-
| colspan="8" style="background:#e9e9e9;"|
|-
| colspan="4" style="text-align:left;" | Registered voters
| 
| style="background:#e9e9e9;"|
| 
| style="background:#e9e9e9;"|
|-
| colspan="4" style="text-align:left;" | Blank/Void ballots
| 
| 2.17%
| 
| 3.70%
|-
| colspan="4" style="text-align:left;" | Turnout
| 
| 65.31%
| 
| 68.68%
|-
| colspan="4" style="text-align:left;" | Abstentions
| 
| 34.69%
| 
| 31.32%
|-
| colspan="8" style="background:#e9e9e9;"|
|- style="font-weight:bold"
| colspan="6" style="text-align:left;" | Result
| colspan="2" style="background-color:" | PS HOLD
|}

2002

 
 
 
 
 
 
|-
| colspan="8" style="background:#e9e9e9;"|
|-

1997

 
 
 
 
 
 
 
|-
| colspan="8" style="background:#e9e9e9;"|
|-

References

Sources
 French Interior Ministry results website: 

1